The Olympic Shooting Range, L'Acadie was a temporary firing range located in L'Acadie, Quebec. For the 1976 Summer Olympics held in neighbouring Montreal, it hosted the shooting and the shooting part of the modern pentathlon events.

References
1976 Summer Olympics official report. Volume 2. pp. 186–9.
1976 Summer Olympics official report. Volume 3. pp. 528–30, 564–83.

Venues of the 1976 Summer Olympics
Olympic modern pentathlon venues
Olympic shooting venues
Sports venues in Quebec
Sport in Saint-Jean-sur-Richelieu